Kostermanthus heteropetalus is a tree in the family Chrysobalanaceae. The specific epithet  is from the Greek meaning "uneven or unequal petals".

Description
The fissured bark is grey-brown. The flowers are pink, tinged white.

Distribution and habitat
Kostermanthus heteropetalus grows naturally in Sumatra, Peninsular Malaysia, Borneo, the Philippines and Sulawesi. Its habitat is mixed dipterocarp forests from sea-level to  altitude.

References

Chrysobalanaceae
Trees of Malesia
Plants described in 1897